Déguy Alain Didier Zokora (born 14 December 1980) is an Ivorian former professional footballer who played as a defensive midfielder. He represented the Ivory Coast national team for 14 years, beginning in 2000, and is currently the nation's most capped player. He now serves as an assistant manager at AFAD Djékanou.

Club career

Early career
Zokora was born in Abidjan, and started his career at Académie MimoSifcom. He was offered a professional contract along with his younger brother, Armando, with Ivorian club ASEC Mimosas. Tragedy struck though as Armando drowned to death celebrating at the beach in Grand-Bassam; in memory of his brother and hero, Zokora has Armand tattooed on his right forearm.

In 2000, Zokora moved abroad to play for Belgian side Genk, where he won the Jupiler League during the 2001–02 campaign, as manager Sef Vergoossen was named Coach of the Year and Wesley Sonck won top goal-scorer honors in the league. Zokora went on to feature in 126 matches for the club and was memorably part of the squad that recorded a 1–1 home draw with Real Madrid on 12 November 2002. In the summer of 2004, he joined Saint-Étienne in the French Ligue 1.

Tottenham Hotspur
Zokora joined Tottenham Hotspur in the summer of 2006 following his performances for the Ivory Coast at the 2006 FIFA World Cup in Germany. The deal was reported by media as being worth £8.2 million. Shortly after joining the Premier League club, it was announced on 24 October 2006 that Zokora had contracted malaria after falling ill on the morning of a UEFA Cup group match against Beşiktaş in Istanbul. Zokora was in the hospital for four days and then spent a period of two weeks recovering, missing the win over Beşiktaş, two Premier League matches and a League Cup fixture as well. It was announced on 31 October that Zokora had returned to training with first-team.

Zokora won the 2007–08 League Cup with Tottenham, their first major title in nine years, as a header from Jonathan Woodgate's face secured a 2–1 extra time victory over London rivals Chelsea. He was also part of the Tottenham side which returned to Wembley Stadium the following year to play in the League Cup final, this time against Manchester United. Tottenham lost this game on penalties after the sides drew 0–0 after extra time, with Zokora playing the full 120 minutes. Zokora managed to score a penalty in the shoot-out against PSV in the UEFA Cup.

On 30 August 2008, Zokora signed a new four-year deal with Spurs that tied him to White Hart Lane until the summer of 2012. In January 2009, however, the club signed Honduran defensive midfielder Wilson Palacios from Wigan Athletic; the signing relegated Zokora to the substitutes' bench, and he played the full 90 minutes just three times after January. On 15 March, Zokora started at right back for Spurs to try and curtail the pace and trickery of Aston Villa winger Ashley Young. In the match, Zokora picked up an early booking and was substituted off after 30 minutes for natural defender Vedran Ćorluka.

Sevilla
During the 2009 summer transfer window, Zokora signed for Spanish La Liga side Sevilla for an undisclosed fee, including a reported €30 million release clause. He made his debut for the club on 30 August 2009 in the first round of the 2009–10 La Liga season in a 2–0 loss to Valencia, entering as a 21st-minute substitute for the injured Romaric. In his first season in Andalusia, Zokora managed to help take Sevilla back into the UEFA Champions League after finishing La Liga in fourth position. In addition to the Liga success, he helped his side claim their fifth Copa del Rey title by defeating 2010 UEFA Europa League winners Atlético Madrid 2–0 in the final at Camp Nou.

On 29 January 2011, Zokora came on as a 77th-minute substitute for Federico Fazio and provided his only assist of the season to Álvaro Negredo, as Sevilla battled back from 2–0 down to claim a 3–3 draw with Deportivo de La Coruña.

Trabzonspor
Zokora joined Turkish side Trabzonspor on 2 June 2011 on a four-year deal. The Turkish club announced that the transfer fee was €5 million, with the player earning €1.625 million per season. He made his debut on 10 September 2011 against Manisaspor.

During a 2–0 loss on 15 April 2012 to reigning league champions Fenerbahçe, Zokora was racially abused by their midfielder Emre Belözoğlu. Zokora was quoted as saying that Emre called him a "fucking nigger!"; national papers, including Hürriyet, blasted Emre and he later received a two-match ban by the Turkish Football Federation following the incident. Zokora dished out his own retribution against the former Newcastle United midfielder when the two clubs met again on 6 May in Trabzonspor's 3–1 loss, kicking Emre "with the full force of his right boot" into his crotch with Zokora receiving a yellow card for the challenge.

On 29 April 2014, Zokora left Trabzonspor.

Pune City
In July 2015, Zokora signed for Indian Super League side FC Pune City. He debuted for the side against Delhi Dynamos FC.

North East United
Zokora signed for the Indian Super League side NorthEast United in August 2016. He made his debut coming on as a substitute against Kerala Blasters in a 1–0 win in October 2016. He had his first assist against Delhi Dynamos on 30 November 2016. He has also received 3 yellow cards in 14 matches his first against Delhi Dynamos then vs Mumbai City FC and lastly against FC Pune City. He played mainly as a centre back that season and also captained his side to up to 8 games of the season out of 14.

Semen Padang
Zokora joined Indonesian club side, Semen Padang as a marquee signing on Monday, 24 April 2017. He signed a one-year deal contract. Zokora was one of the biggest transfers in Indonesian football during the 2017 season, after Michael Essien, Carlton Cole, Peter Odemwingie, Shane Smeltz and Mohamed Sissoko all joined the competition. In moving to Indonesia, Zokora became one of a growing number of high-profile players to opt for the Liga 1 late in their career. He was released in August, four months later.

International career

Zokora has played 123 international matches for the Ivory Coast and is their most capped player of all time. He scored his only goal at the international level in a 4–0 defeat of Botswana on 22 June 2008 that moved the Ivory Coast to the top of their group in 2010 FIFA World Cup qualifiers.

During his 12 years with the national side, Zokora helped Les Éléphants to their first two FIFA World Cup finals appearances, in 2006 and 2010. On both occasions, the Ivory Coast were drawn into the so-called "Group of Death", thus valiantly bowing out in third place each time. In the 2010 edition of the tournament, Zokora was forced to play in a new position, centre back, against Portugal to bolster and compact the defence against the strong attacking side; Zokora helped his side earn a 0–0 draw.

During the 2012 Africa Cup of Nations in Gabon and Equatorial Guinea, Zokora said he would retire from international football should the Ivory Coast win the title. Zokora did in fact retire from international football on 28 February 2012, following the end of the tournament, but Les Elephants went down in an 8–7 penalty shoot-out loss to Zambia in the Africa Cup of Nations final.

Despite earlier announcing his retirement, on 1 June 2014 Zokora was included by manager Sabri Lamouchi in the Ivory Coast's 23-man squad for the 2014 World Cup in Brazil.

On 8 September 2014, Zokora announced his second retirement from the national team.

Career statistics

International

Honours
ASEC Mimosas
CAF Super Cup: 1999

Genk
Belgian First Division A: 2001–02

Tottenham Hotspur
Football League Cup: 2007–08; runner-up: 2008–09

Sevilla
Copa del Rey: 2009–10

Ivory Coast
Africa Cup of Nations runner-up: 2006, 2012,

Individual
CAF Team of the Year: 2005, 2006

See also
 List of men's footballers with 100 or more international caps

References

External links

1980 births
Footballers from Abidjan
Living people
Association football midfielders
Ivorian footballers
Ivory Coast international footballers
Ivorian expatriate footballers
Ivorian expatriate sportspeople in Belgium
Expatriate footballers in Belgium
Expatriate footballers in France
Expatriate footballers in England
Expatriate footballers in Spain
ASEC Mimosas players
K.R.C. Genk players
AS Saint-Étienne players
Tottenham Hotspur F.C. players
Sevilla FC players
Trabzonspor footballers
Akhisarspor footballers
Belgian Pro League players
Ligue 1 players
Premier League players
La Liga players
Süper Lig players
2002 African Cup of Nations players
2006 FIFA World Cup players
2006 Africa Cup of Nations players
2008 Africa Cup of Nations players
2010 Africa Cup of Nations players
2010 FIFA World Cup players
2012 Africa Cup of Nations players
2013 Africa Cup of Nations players
2014 FIFA World Cup players
FIFA Century Club
Expatriate footballers in Turkey
Ivorian expatriate sportspeople in Turkey
Ivorian expatriate sportspeople in Spain
FC Pune City players
NorthEast United FC players
Expatriate footballers in India
Indian Super League players
Liga 1 (Indonesia) players
Expatriate footballers in Indonesia
Semen Padang F.C. players